Kamiyunai Dam  is an earthfill dam located in Hokkaido Prefecture in Japan. The dam is used for irrigation. The catchment area of the dam is 15.5 km2. The dam impounds about 20  ha of land when full and can store 877 thousand cubic meters of water. The construction of the dam was started on 1950 and completed in 1956.

References

Dams in Hokkaido